Alfred Post (20 August 1926 – 7 March 2013) was a German former footballer who competed in the 1952 Summer Olympics. He was born in Ochtrup.

References

1926 births
2013 deaths
People from Ochtrup
Sportspeople from Münster (region)
German footballers
Association football defenders
Olympic footballers of Germany
Footballers at the 1952 Summer Olympics
German footballers needing infoboxes
Footballers from North Rhine-Westphalia